Donald Sage (born October 5, 1981) is an American track athlete and the winner of the 2002 NCAA Outdoor 1500m championship.

Background

Sage graduated from York Community High School in Elmhurst, Illinois in 2000, where he ran for legendary coach Joe Newton.   He won state titles in cross country (1999) and track & field (1600m (1999 and 2000) and 3200m (1999 and 2000)). In the 2000 Prefontaine Classic Sage ran a 4:00.29 mile, the 12th best performance ever by a high school runner. That also made him the 2nd fastest high school runner to not break the 4 minute barrier.
Sage attended Stanford University.  He was a three time All-American in cross country, helping the Cardinal to 2 team championships (2002, 2003) and a seven time All-American in track, including his victory in the 2002 outdoor 1500m.

Personal bests

References

External links

1981 births
Living people
People from Elmhurst, Illinois
American male middle-distance runners
Stanford Cardinal men's track and field athletes
Sportspeople from Illinois
Stanford Cardinal men's cross country runners